The University of Texas at San Antonio College of Liberal and Fine Arts (known to many students as "COLFA") is UTSA's largest college. It offers degrees through its 11 departments, administering 33% of all UTSA credit hours.

Departments

Anthropology
UTSA's Department of Anthropology uses the four-field approach towards the study of humanity. It believes this provides students with a well-rounded understanding of the discipline.

Art & Art History
The Department of Art and Art History has a variety of programs, to include Art History, Ceramics, New Media, Painting, Photography, Printmaking and Sculpture. It hosts an annual display of school talent, called the "Student Exhibit", during the spring semester. There are over 400 art majors within the Department of Art and Art History at UTSA.

Communication
The Department of Communication is another component to the College of Liberal and Fine Arts. It currently offers both graduate and undergraduate degrees. The University of Texas at San Antonio houses a collection of records from the Communication Department.

English
The Department of English houses roughly 600 English undergraduates and 100 graduate students. The University of Texas at San Antonio houses a collection of records from the Writing Program. The collection spans the dates 1990 through 2003, comprising syllabi for UTSA's Writing Program courses.

History

Modern Languages & Literatures

Music
The University of Texas at San Antonio houses a collection of records from the Music Department. The collection spans the years 1975 through 2006 and includes programs of recitals and concerts of the faculty and students of the UTSA Music Department. Also included are black-and-white photographs of various performances and events.

Philosophy and Classics

Political Science and Geography

References

Liberal and Fine Arts